Simile is the Black township on the northern side of the forestry town Sabie. It falls under the Thaba Chweu Local Municipality of Mpumalanga province, South Africa.

References

Populated places in the Thaba Chweu Local Municipality